Omey may refer to the following:

France
 Omey (commune), a commune in north-eastern France.

Ireland
Omey (civil parish), a civil parish in County Galway.
Omey Island, an island in County Galway

Surname
 Tom Omey, retired Belgian athlete